Abrodictyum caudatum is an epiphytic fern, found in rainforests in eastern Australia.

References 

Hymenophyllales
Flora of New South Wales
Flora of Queensland
Flora of Victoria (Australia)
Plants described in 1854